Ieva Krasnova (born 7 May 2001) is a Latvian footballer who plays as a forward for Sieviešu Futbola Līga club FK Dinamo Rīga and the Latvia women's national team.

References

2001 births
Living people
Latvian women's footballers
Women's association football forwards
Latvia women's youth international footballers
Latvia women's international footballers